Quiulacocha (possibly from Quechua qillwa, qiwlla, qiwiña gull, qucha lake, "gull lake") is a mountain at a lake of that name in the Huaguruncho mountain range in the Andes of Peru. It is located in the Pasco Region, Pasco Province, Ticlacayán District.

The intermittent stream of the valley flows to the southeast. It belongs to the watershed of the Perené River.

References

Mountains of Peru
Mountains of Pasco Region
Lakes of Peru
Lakes of Pasco Region